Luigi "Gigi" Meroni (24 February 1943 – 15 October 1967) was an Italian professional footballer who played as a winger.

He played 145 matches in Serie A, scoring 29 goals. At international level, he represented Italy on six occasions between 1966 and 1967, scoring two goals, and took part at the 1966 FIFA World Cup.

Club career
Meroni, of Gypsy heritage, began playing football in a small courtyard of 60 square metres, and then moved to the field of the Oratorio di San Bartolomeo in Como. From the age of two he had lost his father. His mother Rosa, a professional weaver, had financial difficulties raising three children: Celestino, Luigi (called Luigino, then Gigi) and Maria. His first job was as a designer of silk neckties, he also devoted himself to painting.

His football career began in the Como youth sector, where he also made his debut for the first team, albeit in the second division. He was then sold to Genoa. In the shadow of the Lanterna, Meroni had moments of great notoriety. On the last match of the season, Meroni refused to undergo examinations for doping control, saying that he had forgotten the test in a hotel. Three other players tested positive for amphetamines and Meroni was suspended for the first five games of Serie A in 1963.

In 1964, despite the discontent of the Genoa fans, Meroni was sold to Torino, a team coached by Nereo Rocco and on the rise after the decline following the tragedy of Superga. The transfer fee was 300 million lira, a record at the time for a player of only 21 years of age.

He was nicknamed la farfalla granata the "maroon butterfly", with reference to his style of play and anticonformist outfits (he was notorious for his cohabitation as husband and wife with a young divorcee, Cristiana Uderstadt), and the "beatnik del gol" (the beatnik of goal) for his artistic interests and hippie lifestyle.

Along with striker Nestor Combin, he formed a successful attacking partnership, preceding the glorious attacking partnership of Paolo Pulici and Francesco Graziani (i gemelli del gol, the goal twins) at Torino years later.

Rumors of his move to cross-city rivals Juventus, for an offer of 750 million lire, triggered a sort of "crisis" and then popular Torino president Orfeo Pianelli, under the pressure of the fans, declined.

In 1967 at San Siro, after one of his famous dribbles, he lobbed the ball from the edge of box into the top corner of the goal, interrupting the unbeaten home run of the Grande Inter of Helenio Herrera, forcing Inter Milan to be defeated after three years of positive results.

International career
Meroni made 6 appearances for Italian national team between 1966 and 1967, scoring 2 goals. His first call-up for Italy was in a qualifier against Poland in 1966, making his debut on 19 March 1966, in a 0–0 away draw against France. He scored the first goal for the Azzurri in Bologna, 14 June 1966, marking the sixth goal of the Italy–Bulgaria 6–1 friendly match in preparation for the World Cup. He scored a goal in the other friendly, Italy–Argentina 3–0, held in Turin eight days later.

He participated in the ill-fated expedition led by coach Edmondo Fabbri at the World Cup in England in 1966, which culminated with the incredible 1–0 defeat to North Korea, and Italy's elimination in the first round. The continuing differences with the coach meant Meroni only played the second game against the USSR.

Style of play
Nicknamed La Farfalla Granata ("The Maroon Butterfly", as maroon is colour associated with Torino F.C.), Meroni was a quick, creative, agile, and modern right winger that wore the number 7 shirt. A diminutive, elegant, and highly talented player, with a slender build, who was regarded as one Italy's most promising wingers, his biggest strength was his excellent and unpredictable dribbling ability, which allowed him to trick and beat opposing defenders with feints. Due to his acceleration, speed, mobility, and technical skills, he would often undertake individual runs, coming face to face with the goalkeeper in one on one situations, after dribbling through the entire opposition defence, before scoring. Due to his playing position and unique offensive style of play, which combined searing pace with grace and outstanding technique, Meroni was often compared to George Best throughout his career, a comparison which was also strengthened due to their similar appearance, Beatles–inspired hairstyle, lifestyle off the pitch, and personality.

Death
On 15 October 1967, Meroni died at the age of 24. Shortly after the end of a 4–2 victory over Sampdoria, in which he was sent off, Meroni was hit by a car while recklessly crossing Corso Re Umberto in Turin with his friend and Torino teammate Fabrizio Poletti.

Honours

Individual
Torino F.C. Hall of Fame: 2015

References

External links

1943 births
1967 deaths
Italian footballers
Italy international footballers
1966 FIFA World Cup players
Como 1907 players
Genoa C.F.C. players
Torino F.C. players
Serie A players
Serie B players
Italian Romani people
Romani footballers
Road incident deaths in Italy
Sportspeople from Como
Association football midfielders
Footballers from Lombardy